Douglas Smith (9 October 1880 – 27 February 1933) was an Australian cricketer. He played three first-class matches for Tasmania between 1903 and 1905.

See also
 List of Tasmanian representative cricketers

References

External links
 

1880 births
1933 deaths
Australian cricketers
Tasmania cricketers
Cricketers from Tasmania